Mercedes León García (born 27 May 1958) is a Spanish actress and theatre director. She graduated from Malaga Theatre Institute. She is best known for her role in the film La isla mínima for which she was nominated for Goya Award for Best Supporting Actress. She also appeared in the telenovela El secreto de Puente Viejo which aired on Antena 3.

Filmography 
Television

Theatre productions 
 A sangre
 Cinco cubiertos
 El perfil izquierdo de Ricardo
 El regalo
 El sabor de la yuca
 La noche no duerme
 Toque de queda
 Tres deseos

Awards and nominations 
Nominated for Goya Award for Best Supporting Actress for La isla mínima

References 

Place of birth missing (living people)
Spanish film actresses
Spanish television actresses
Spanish theatre directors
1958 births
Living people
Women theatre directors
21st-century Spanish actresses